Neil Graham Moran (September 2, 1941 – October 27, 2011), known professionally as T. Max Graham, was an American actor. He played the owner of the pencil factory in David Lynch's film Eraserhead.

Selected filmography
 Angel Unchained (1970) - Magician
 Eraserhead (1977) - The Boss
 Gypsy Angels (1980) - Sergeant
 The Sting II (1983) - Tom (The Bartender)
 Kansas (1988) - Mr. Kennedy
 The Burden of Proof (1992, TV Movie) - Lt. Ray Radczyk
 Article 99 (1992) - Captain
 I Can Make You Love Me (1993, TV Movie) - Captain Olson
 Dark Summer (1994) - Timekeeper / Seconds / Refs
 My Antonia (1995, TV Movie) - Mr. Harling
 Ride with the Devil (1999) - Reverend Wright
 More Than Puppy Love (2002) - Track Coach
 Silence (2002) - County Sheriff
 Bunker Hill (2008) - Mayor Tompkins
 Bonnie & Clyde vs. Dracula (2008) - Jake
 The Only Good Indian (2009) - Finkle

References

External links

1941 births
2011 deaths
American male film actors
Deaths from cancer in Missouri